Guzmania eduardi is a plant species in the genus Guzmania. This species is native to Ecuador and Colombia.

Cultivars
Guzmania 'Spirit of '76'

References

eduardi
Flora of Ecuador
Flora of Colombia
Plants described in 1888